Angela Bloomfield (born 11 December 1972) is a New Zealand actor and director.

Early life
Bloomfield attended Massey High School in West Auckland, New Zealand.

Career
Bloomfield has starred in Shortland Street continuously on and off for 24 years, transforming Rachel McKenna from the school girl daughter of clinic boss into a university student, a Shortland Street clinic employee and CEO of Shortland Street Hospital.

Bloomfield has also performed in a number of feature films including Bonjour Timothy and The Frighteners. She has also appeared in smaller TV shows such as The Adventures of the Black Stallion, Betty's Bunch, Ride with the Devil and Power Rangers Ninja Storm in small roles.
Acting took a back seat for three years when she became a mother of two but she  kept her hand in directing for Shortland Street. 
Bloomfield has also been a contestant on the N.Z show, Dancing with the Stars and was voted as having New Zealand's best breasts for the Fayreform National Breast Pride Week in 2006. Bloomfield returned to Shortland Street  as Rachel in October 2009 as a series regular and then left Shortland Street once again in 2016.
In August 2021, it was announced that she would feature in the 2021 Season of 
Celebrity Treasure Island 2021.

Personal life
Bloomfield is separated from husband Chris Houston and has two children. She currently works in the real estate industry on the North Shore.

Filmography

Film

Television

Other work

References

External links
 

1972 births
Living people
New Zealand television actresses
New Zealand film actresses
People educated at Massey High School
New Zealand soap opera actresses
20th-century New Zealand actresses
21st-century New Zealand actresses